Blaine County is a county in the U.S. state of Nebraska. As of the 2010 United States Census, the population was 478, making it Nebraska's second-least populous county and the sixth-least populous in the United States. Its county seat is Brewster. The county was formed in 1885 and organized in 1886. It is named after presidential candidate James G. Blaine.

In the Nebraska license plate system, Blaine County is represented by the prefix 86 (it had the 86th-largest number of vehicles registered in the state when the license plate system was established in 1922).

Geography

Major highways
  Nebraska Highway 2
  Nebraska Highway 7
  Nebraska Highway 91

Adjacent counties

 Loup County – east
 Custer County – south
 Logan County – southwest
 Thomas County – west
 Cherry County – northwest
 Brown County – north

National protected area
 Nebraska National Forest (part)

Demographics

As of the 2000 United States Census, there were 583 people, 238 households, and 168 families in the county. The population density was 0.82 person per square mile (0.32/km2). There were 333 housing units at an average density of 0.5 per square mile (0.2/km2). The racial makeup of the county was 98.97% White, 0.51% Native American, and 0.51% from two or more races; 0.17% of the population were Hispanic or Latino of any race. 45.1% were of German, 12.2% English, 10.2% Irish and 8.4% American ancestry.

There were 238 households, of which 30.30% had children under the age of 18 living with them, 66.00% were married couples living together, 2.50% had a female householder with no husband present, and 29.00% were non-families. 26.90% of all households were made up of individuals, and 13.90% had someone living alone who was 65 years of age or older. The average household size was 2.45 and the average family size was 2.98.

The county population contained 26.20% under the age of 18, 3.90% from 18 to 24, 26.60% from 25 to 44, 26.40% from 45 to 64, and 16.80% who were 65 years of age or older. The median age was 40 years. For every 100 females there were 101.70 males. For every 100 females age 18 and over, there were 100.90 males.

The median income for a household in the county was $25,278, and the median income for a family was $28,472. Males had a median income of $17,917 versus $20,000 for females. The per capita income for the county was $12,323. About 18.70% of families and 19.40% of the population were below the poverty line, including 21.70% of those under age 18 and 9.40% of those age 65 or over.

Religion
More than 25% of the residents of Blaine County belong to the Church of Jesus Christ of Latter-day Saints.  No other county in the state — or anywhere else so far east in the country — has more than 25% membership. This however may actually reflect an oddity in the system used to come to these numbers more than it does reality. Every adjacent county is in the category "none reported" and the method used to get the numbers involved seems to be built around taking the membership numbers of all wards and branches in the county and assigning all those people to the county. This method does not work when a ward or branch covers multiple counties.

Communities

Villages
 Brewster (county seat)
 Dunning
 Halsey (partial)

Unincorporated communities
 Purdum
 Linscott

Politics
Blaine County voters are strongly Republican. In only four national elections since 1900 has the county selected the Democratic Party candidate, & none since 1936.

References

 
Nebraska counties
1886 establishments in Nebraska
The Church of Jesus Christ of Latter-day Saints in the United States
Populated places established in 1886